Darren Morris (born 24 September 1974) is a former Wales international rugby union player who also represented the British & Irish Lions. He moved to Texas in 2015 as Director of Rugby for Griffins Rugby in Dallas, Texas, USA.

Club career
Morris was born in Aberdare, and educated at Aberdare Boys School, Neath College and the University of Glamorgan (now the University of South Wales). Played for Neath RFC from 1992 to 1998, and during this period also played in Brisbane for Eastern Suburbs Tigers, where they made it to the Grand Final in 1995. During this time he was also involved with the Queensland Reds. He then moved to Swansea RFC in 1998 where the club won numerous leagues and cups. He captained Swansea RFC their 2002/2003 season. Morris then joined Leicester Tigers with England props Graham Rowntree and Julian White. Morris signed for Worcester Warriors and made 64 appearances for the club.

He joined Cardiff Blues. In January 2010, Morris signed for Northampton Saints until the end of the season. The following season Morris joined RGC 1404 as a forwards coach whilst involved Ampthill RUFC. Morris then joined Hartpury College in a player-coach role before announcing his retirement from playing at the end of the 2011–12 season. In 2011 he signed as scrum coach for the Russian national team and went to the 2011 World cup. He continued this role and became forwards coach of the Russia's national team in 2012 to 2013. In 2013 he took a role as Director of Rugby in Krasnodar for a full-time team called Kuban, taking them to their highest ever position in their first season at the highest level of rugby in Russia.

He returned to rugby in 2013, signing for Doncaster Knights as a player-coach as well as helping them get promoted back to the Championship that season.

International career
Darren Morris began his international career at the age of 15 for Wales U-15's. Morris continued to play international rugby with both Welsh schools (U-18's) which he captained and then moving onto Welsh Youth (U-19's), and Welsh U-21's.

Although Morris was selected for Wales in 1996, injury prevented him from being able to play. He made his Senior Wales début on 6 June 1998 against Zimbabwe. He played in the 2001 Six Nations and Morris played on the 2001 British & Irish Lions tour to Australia.

He also went on the 2004 tour to Argentina and South Africa under Mike Ruddock.

In 2005 he was again involved with the British & Irish Lions on their practice squad and standby.

References

External links
 Welsh Rugby Profile at WRU.co.uk
 Worcester Warriors Profile at Warriors.co.uk
 Tigers profile
 Guinness Premiership Profile at GuinnessPremiership.com
 Wales Online: players you might have forgotten
 British & Irish Lions profile

1974 births
Living people
Alumni of the University of Glamorgan
Alumni of the University of South Wales
British & Irish Lions rugby union players from Wales
Houston SaberCats coaches
Leicester Tigers players
Neath RFC players
Northampton Saints players
Rugby union players from Aberdare
Swansea RFC players
Wales international rugby union players
Welsh rugby union players
Worcester Warriors players
Ampthill RUFC players
Rugby union props